Georges Salles (24 September 1889 – 20 October 1966) was a 20th-century French art historian and curator.

Biography
A specialist of the East, George Salles      led excavations in Iran, Afghanistan, and China. He was then curator at the Asian Arts Department of the Louvre Museum, and in 1941 director of the Guimet Museum. Speaking of the first General Conference of the ICOM, held in Paris in 1948, its president Georges Salles reported that "It has enabled a better understanding of the skills needed in our time by the curator of a museum if he/she is to fulfill h/h duties in a satisfactory manner." Between 1945 and 1957 he was director of the Museums of France. With Jean Cassou, he laid the foundations for a new design of the museum of modern art, to make art available to the greatest number. It is with his support that were made the ceiling by Georges Braque at the Louvre, the fresco of Pablo Picasso and the wall of Joan Miró at the UNESCO, all famous painters of whom he was a friend. Himself a collector, he bought works of young artists such as Mark Tobey. He published a Histoire des Arts de l’Orient, then Au Louvre, scènes de la vie du musée, and Le Regard in 1939. With André Malraux, he headed the series L’Univers des formes.

In 1953, Salles joined the cultural council of the Cultural Circle of Royaumont.

Points of view

References

Bibliography
 Histoire des Arts de l’Orient
 Au Louvre, scènes de la vie du musée
 Introduction de l'ouvrage Arts de la Chine ancienne (1937)
 Le Regard (1939)
 La Tapisserie française du Moyen Âge à nos jours (Catalogue, 1946)
 Julio Gonzales. Dessins et aquarelles. Couverture lithographique de Mourlot. (Éditions Berggruen, 1957)
 Numerous and various contributions in l'Illustration, le Figaro, L'Œil (including No. 47 of 15 November 1958), etc.

External links
 Georges Salles on data.bnf.fr
 Obituary on Persée
 Salles, Georges on Dictionary of art historians

1889 births
1966 deaths
People from Sèvres 
French art historians
French art curators